Antun Fischer (12 April 1911 – 27 July 1985) was a Serbian wrestler. He competed in the men's Greco-Roman welterweight at the 1936 Summer Olympics.

References

External links
 

1911 births
1985 deaths
Serbian male sport wrestlers
Olympic wrestlers of Yugoslavia
Wrestlers at the 1936 Summer Olympics
Sportspeople from Subotica